Sirf....Life looks greener on the other side is a 2008 movie about four couples from different strata of life. It is about how each couple feels that the other couple's life is better than theirs. It tries to portray the lifestyle of people in metro. The movie comes under the banner of Seven Eagles productions. It is produced by Sanjay Kotadia, Ghanshyam Patel, Kanu Patel. After working with Rajkumar Santoshi as an assistant director for China Gate, Pukar and Lajja, this is the first film as director for Rajaatesh Nayar.

The movie revolves around four couples starring Manisha Koirala, Ranvir Shorey, Kay Kay Menon, Sonali Kulkarni, Parvin Dabbas, Rituparna Sengupta.

Plot
Mumbai, the commercial capital of India, is a city that never sleeps. Rapidly changing at a feverish pace with every passing second, it is always on the move and so are the people living in it. In this story, we take an insight into the lives of the people living in this city and how the pace of the city affects their relationships and how they deal with it. No matter what happens life has to go on.

This is also a story of four couples and their lives in a metropolitan city. They belong to different social and financial strata and every one has got its own problems to deal with. What one couple has, the other doesn't? Each couple looks at the other couple and wishes that if only they had what the other couple does, their life would be a bed of roses, be it on a monetary level or on moral terms. What seems to be a major and almost insoluble problem for the first couple is just a petty issue for the second. Similarly, second couple's serious problem is not looked upon as a problem at all by the first and likewise so, with the other two couples. In a pursuit to achieve what they lack and in a desperate search of that one thing that would solve all their problems, they find themselves lost in the ever-moving crowd, where no one has time for themselves, leave aside the cares of the world.

In due course of time, all four couples come together with a distant vision of that one event which would end all their problems and set them free. Is it reality or just a figment of their vivid imagination?

Characters
Ankur Khanna and Nauheed Cyrusi as Rahul and Shalu:

Rahul and Shalu belong to the lower middle income group. For them, the biggest and most difficult task on earth is getting married and starting a new life together. What good is love without money?

Kay Kay Menon and Manisha Koirla as Gaurav and Devika:

Gaurav and Devika belong to the cream of high society. They have everything one could wish for. Still they are not happy as their relationship lacks something, which even they fail to figure out. What
good is money without love?

Parvin Dabbas and Rituparna Sengupta as Amit and Suchita:

Amit and Suchita are an upper middle class couple with no financial problems. Amit is at a good position in an advertising agency while Suchita is a housewife. They are a loving couple. But what good is love without faith?

Ranvir Shorey and Sonali Kulkarni as Akash and Namita:

Akash and Namita live in a suburb at a distance from their offices. They love each other and but are not willing to understand each other's limitations. What good is love without understanding?

Cast 
 Kay Kay Menon as Gaurav 
 Manisha Koirala as Devika
 Ranvir Shorey as Akash
 Sonali Kulkarni as Namita
 Parvin Dabbas as Amit
 Rituparna Sengupta as Suchita
 Ankur Khanna as Rahul
 Nauheed Cyrusi as Shalu
 Kanisha Nayyar as Kittu

Soundtrack

The soundtrack of the film is composed by Sohail Sen and Shibani Kashyap. The lyrics are penned by Mehboob and Vipul Saini. The album contains six original tracks and one reprise track.

References

External links
 

2008 films
2000s Hindi-language films
Hindi-language drama films
Films scored by Shibani Kashyap
Films scored by Sohail Sen
Indian drama films
2008 directorial debut films
2008 drama films